Multiphoton lithography (also known as direct laser lithography or direct laser writing) of polymer templates has been known for years by the photonic crystal community. Similar to standard photolithography techniques, structuring is accomplished by illuminating negative-tone or positive-tone photoresists via light of a well-defined wavelength. The fundamental difference is, however, the avoidance of reticles. Instead, two-photon absorption is utilized to induce a dramatic change in the solubility of the resist for appropriate developers.

Hence, multiphoton lithography is a technique for creating small features in a photosensitive material, without the use of complex optical systems or photomasks. This method relies on a multi-photon absorption process in a material that is transparent at the wavelength of the laser used for creating the pattern. By scanning and properly modulating the laser, a chemical change (usually polymerization) occurs at the focal spot of the laser and can be controlled to create an arbitrary three-dimensional periodic or non-periodic pattern. This method has been used for rapid prototyping of structures with fine features.

Two-photon absorption is a third-order with respect to the third-order optical susceptibility  and a second-order process with respect to light intensity. For this reason it is a non-linear process several orders of magnitude weaker than linear absorption, thus very high light intensities are required to increase the number of such rare events. For example, tightly-focused laser beams provide the needed intensities. Here, pulsed laser sources are preferred as they deliver high-intensity pulses while depositing a relatively low average energy. To enable 3D structuring, the light source must be adequately adapted to the photoresist in that single-photon absorption is highly suppressed while two-photon absorption is favoured. This condition is met if and only if the resist is highly transparent for the laser light's output wavelength λ and, simultaneously, absorbing at λ/2. As a result, a given sample relative to the focused laser beam can be scanned while changing the resist's solubility only in a confined volume. The geometry of the latter mainly depends on the iso-intensity surfaces of the focus. Concretely, those regions of the laser beam which exceed a given exposure threshold of the photosensitive medium define the basic building block, the so-called voxel. Other parameters which influence the actual shape of the voxel are the laser mode and the refractive-index mismatch between the resist and the immersion system leading to spherical aberration.

It was found that polarization effects in laser 3D nanolithography can be employed to fine-tune the feature sizes (and corresponding aspect ratio) in the structuring of photoresists. This proves polarization to be a variable parameter next to laser power (intensity), scanning speed (exposure duration), accumulated dose, etc.

Recently it was shown that combining ultrafast laser 3D nanolithography followed by thermal treatment one can achieve additive-manufacturing of 3D glass-ceramics. In addition, a plant-derived renewable pure bioresins without additional photosensitization can be employed for the optical rapid prototyping.

Materials for multiphoton polymerization 
The materials employed in multiphoton lithography are those normally used in conventional photolithography techniques. They can be found in liquid-viscous, gel or solid state, in relation to the fabrication need. Liquid resists imply more complex sample fixing processes, during the fabrication step, while the preparation of the resins themselves may be easier and faster. In contrast, solid resists can be handled in an easier way, but they require complex and time-consuming processes. The photopolymers always include a prepolymer (the monomer) and, considering the final application, a photoinitiator, as a catalyzer for the polymerization reaction. In addition, we can find such polymerization inhibitors (useful to stabilize resins both reducing the obtained voxel), solvents (which may simplify casting procedures), thickens (so called "fillers") and other additives (as pigments and so on) which aim to functionalize the photopolymer.

Acrylates 
The acrylates are the most diffused resin components. They can be found in many traditional photolithography processes which imply a radical reaction. They are largely diffused and commercially available in a wide range of products, having different properties and composition. The main advantages of this kind of resists are found in the excellent mechanical properties and in a reduced shrinkage capacity. Finally the polymerization steps are faster than other kind of photopolymers. Acrylic hybrid organic/inorganic resists are largely diffused due to their biocompatible and structural behavior, the most famous ones are the ceramic based OMOCERs material family and the silicon-ceramic based SZ2080. The latter, has encountered a wide use in the biological and photonic field, thanks to the tunable optical capability (such as the refractive index), just by changing the inorganic phase ratio.

Epoxy resins 
These are the most employed resins into the MEMS and microfluidic fields. They exploit cationic polymerization. One of the best known epoxy resin is SU-8, which allows thin film deposition (up to 500 µm) and polymerization of structures with a high aspect ratio. We can find many others epoxy resins such as: SCR-701, largely employed in micro moving objects, and the SCR-500.

Applications 
Nowadays there are several application fields for microstructured devices, made by multiphoton polymerization, such as: regenerative medicine, biomedical engineering, micromechanic, microfluidic, atomic force microscopy, optics and telecommunication science.

Regenerative medicine and biomedical engineering 
By the arrival of biocompatible photopolymers (as SZ2080 and OMOCERs) many scaffolds have been realized by multiphoton lithography, to date. They vary in key parameters as geometry, porosity and dimension to control and condition, in a mechanical and chemical fashion, fundamental cues in in vitro cell cultures: migration, adhesion, proliferation and differentiation. The capability to fabricate structures having a feature size smaller than the cells' one, have dramatically improved the mechanobiology field, giving the possibility to combine mechanical cues directly into cells microenvironment. Their final application range from stemness maintenance in adult mesenchymal stem cells, such as into the NICHOID scaffold which mimics in vitro a physiological niche, to the generation of migration engineered scaffolds.

Micromechanic and microfluidic 
The multiphoton polymerization can be suitable to realize microsized active (as pumps) or passive (as filters) devices that can be combined with Lab-on-a-chip. These devices can be widely used coupled to microchannels with the advantage to polymerize in pre-sealed channels. Considering filters, they can be used to separate the plasma from the red blood cells, to separate cell populations (in relation to the single cell dimension) or basically to filter solutions from impurity and debris. A porous 3D filter, which can only be fabricated by 2PP technology, offers two key advantages compared to filters based on 2D pillars. First, the 3D filter has increased mechanical resistance to shear stresses, enabling a higher void ratio and hence more efficient operation. Second, the 3D porous filter can efficiently filter disk-shaped elements without reducing the pore size to the minimum dimension of the cell.  Considering the integrated micropumps, they can be polymerized as two-lobed independent rotors, confined into the channel by their own shaft, to avoid unwanted rotations. Such systems are simply activated by using focalized CW laser system.

Atomic force microscopy 
To date, atomic force microscopy microtips are realized with standard photolithographic techniques on hard materials, such as gold, silicon, and its derivatives. Nonetheless, the mechanical properties of such materials require time-consuming and expensive production processes to create or bend the tips. Multiphoton lithography can be used to prototype and modify, thus avoiding the complex fabrication protocol.

Optics 
With the ability to create 3D planar structures, multiphoton polymerization can build optical components for optical waveguides, resonators, photonic crystals, and lens.

References

External links
Nano sculptures, the first nano-scale human form. Sculpture made by artist Jonty Hurwitz using multiphoton lithography, November 2014.

Nonlinear optics
Lithography (microfabrication)
Computer printing
Printing processes